Torch Technologies is a 100% employee-owned system engineering, applied science, modeling & simulation and information technology business. Its primary customers are the United States Army Aviation and Missile Command (AMCOM) and the Missile Defense Agency, although it has contracts with other DoD agencies including the Navy and the Air Force. Torch has over 1100 employee-owners and is headquartered in Huntsville, AL, with technical offices located in Aberdeen, MD, Albuquerque, NM, Boston, MA, Colorado Springs, CO, Detroit, MI, Honolulu, HI, Patuxent River, MD, and Shalimar, FL.

History
Torch Technologies was co-founded in 2002 in Huntsville, AL by Bill Roark and Don Holder. Roark and Holder respectively had 30 and 40 years of experience in Department of Defense research and development programs and other contracts. The company's location was chosen due to proximity to Redstone Arsenal, which serves as headquarters of several large Army organizations such as AMCOM and offices belonging to US Army Aviation. Upon the company's formation, the co-founders began to aggressively recruit a team of senior engineers, and set out to build a reputation for good service and competitive pricing. In 2005, Roark began to take steps that would allow Torch to become employee-owned (via an ESOP), and the company attained 100% employee ownership in 2010. Roark desired employee-ownership and profit sharing because such management styles have been proven to reduce employee attrition rates and increase job satisfaction. In 2008, Torch began bidding as a prime government contractor. With the receipt of four direct award prime task orders on AMCOM Express, the company won more contracts in two weeks in late 2008 than the previous six years of combined government work. In late 2016, Torch completed a $12 million renovation of the two existing buildings it owns in South Huntsville.  Torch received economic incentives from the city of Huntsville, the Tennessee Valley Authority and the state of Alabama to keep its headquarters in south Huntsville as opposed to moving to Cummings Research Park in hopes of growing economic activity in the immediate area. Torch has since had two more major expansions in south Huntsville, with the (2017) completion of a conference center, the Freedom Center and the (2019) completion of the Technology Integration & Prototyping Center. While Torch is headquartered in Huntsville, with eight technical offices located throughout the United States, they have employee-owners located in several additional markets, including California; Ohio, Oklahoma, Pennsylvania, Texas, Virginia, Kwajalein, and Egypt.

Areas of Expertise
Weapon System Performance Analysis to include sensors/seekers, aerodynamics, guidance and control, target discrimination, endgame performance, and command and control; Modeling and Simulation with emphasis primarily on high-fidelity level simulations including all digital simulations, Software-in-the-Loop (SWIL) and Hardware-in-the-Loop (HWIL) simulations; Information Technology such as distributed simulations/data management, visualization techniques, high performance computers, and network integration; Manned and Unmanned Aviation; Test & Evaluation (T&E); and Advanced Technology Research and Development including development, testing, and implementation of innovative algorithms and software.

Awards
2016-2021 Best Workplaces in Consulting & Professional Services by Great Place to Work
 2021 and 2018 ESOP Company of the Year by the New South Chapter of The ESOP Association
2006-2020 Inc 5000 List by Inc. magazine
2020 Best Workplaces for Parents by Great Place to Work
2020 and 2018 Best Workplaces for Millennials by Great Place to Work
2015-2020 Washington Technology "Top 100 Government Contractors" List 
2017-2020 Bloomberg Government "Top 200" List List 
2017-2019 Entrepreneur 360 List by Entrepreneur magazine "Entrepreneur 360 List" 
2016-2018 Best Small and Medium Workplaces by Great Place to Work and FORTUNE
2018 2018 Best Workplaces for Millennials by Great Place to Work and FORTUNE 
Outstanding Mechanical Engineering Firm by the American Society of Mechanical Engineers, North Alabama Section
2016 Torch was one of 25 companies included in the Forbes list of "The Best Small Companies in America"
 2015-2018 "Top Tiger" Award of the fastest-growing companies founded, owned, or led by Auburn University alumni
 2013 Partners in Philanthropy Award by the Community foundation of Huntsville/Madison County
 2012, 2013 Inc. Magazine's Hire Power Award, given to private firms that create the most jobs nationally 
 2012 Innovations in Employee Ownership Award given by the National Center for Employee-Ownership (NCEO)
 Winner of the 2012 Best Places to Work by the Huntsville/Madison County Chamber of Commerce 
2011 U.S. SBA Region IV Small Business Prime Contractor of the Year
 2011 Top Small Company Workplace by Inc. Magazine 
 2009 Entrepreneur of the Year Award, Bill Roark (Torch CEO) selected as Southeast region finalist for the Ernst & Young award 
2008 Ten Best Companies for Employee Financial Security by The Principal Financial Group
2008, 2012, 2016, 2017 and 2018 “Best Places to Work in Huntsville/Madison County"
2008 IT/Technology Business of the Year by the Alabama Information Technology Association
2007 Small Business of the Year by the Huntsville Chamber of Commerce(Technology Category)
 2006 AITA Technology Company of the Year by the Alabama Information Technology Association (AITA) (Small Business category finalist) 
2006 #54 in Entrepreneur Magazine's Hot 100 Fastest Growing New Companies in the United States
2005, 2009, and 2015 Award for Marketplace Ethics by the North Alabama Better Business Bureau

References

Bibliography
http://www.inc.com/profile/torch-technologies
http://www.bbb.org/northern-alabama/business-reviews/technology-services-defense-industry/torch-technologies-in-huntsville-al-900006303
http://www.al.com/business/index.ssf/2014/03/torch_technologies_in_huntsvil.html
http://investing.businessweek.com/research/stocks/private/snapshot.asp?privcapId=30935926
http://eastsidepartners.com/entrepreneurs/bill-roark/
 The Bible on Leadership: From Moses to Matthew, Management Lessons by Lorin Woolfe
http://whnt.com/2015/03/19/torch-technologies-to-expand-south-huntsville-campus-bring-more-jobs-to-tennessee-valley/

2002 establishments in Alabama
Companies based in Huntsville, Alabama
Technology companies established in 2002